Guardian Angels School is a parochial, Roman Catholic school in Cincinnati, Ohio, United States. This school was awarded an NCLB Blue Ribbon of Excellence in 2007 by the board of education. Its nickname is GA.

The current French Gothic Revival school buildings and rectory are part of a master plan designed by architect Edward J. Schulte, including the main school building (1931), the western addition (1942), and the auditorium/"old church"/gymnasium (1949).  Many alterations, including vinyl windows without mullions, metal mid-century doors, and new exterior lights, have been made to the buildings, compromising the architect's original design.  However, the buildings remain an impressive edifice along Beechmont Avenue in Mt. Washington.

Private schools in Cincinnati
Catholic elementary schools in Ohio
Private middle schools in Ohio